Chantel Ruth Tremitiere (born October 20, 1969) is an American former professional women's basketball player.

Early life 
Tremitiere was born in Williamsport, Pennsylvania. Her father is Arnold Kelly. She was then adopted into the family of William and Barbara Tremitiere as an infant and grew up in York, Pennsylvania. She has 14 brothers and sisters of differing ethnic backgrounds. She grew up playing basketball with her siblings, stating that they needed another player to make two even teams. She averaged 30 points a game at Hannah Penn Middle School and was a basketball star when she transferred to William Penn High School. She graduated from high school in 1987 and chose to attend Auburn University, where she received a full basketball scholarship.

Collegiate career

Tremitiere started every game for the Auburn Tigers women's basketball team in 1991 and averaged 4.1 points and 4.0 assists. In 1990, she was selected to the NCAA All-Tournament Team. She earned her bachelor's degree in Public Relations from Auburn, then was an assistant basketball coach for Auburn (1991–92); the University of Texas (1992–93), and the University of Massachusetts Amherst (1993–96). During this time, Chantel continued her hoop dreams overseas, playing for Lotos Gdynia in Poland, where her play caught the attention of professional scouts.

Auburn statistics
Source

Professional / WNBA career 
In the 1997 draft, Tremitiere was selected as the 18th overall pick by the Sacramento Monarchs. She had her most successful season playing with the Monarchs, averaging 7.6 points and 4.8 assists. She also led the WNBA with an average of 37.5 minutes per game. Chantel was the Sacramento Monarchs' original point guard. Playing for the Monarchs also gave Chantel the opportunity to be reunited with Ruthie Bolton (Holifield), her teammate at Auburn. She also began a non-profit organization called Assist One, which broadcast the stories of children waiting to be adopted in the Sacramento, California, area.

Chantel was traded to Utah in 1998 and played two seasons for the Starzz. She continued to average 5.5 points per game and 3.6 assists over that period. She finished 4th in the WNBA in assists. In 2000, she was acquired in the 6th round of the expansion draft and joined the newly formed Indiana Fever. She played one season for the Fever, suffering from an ankle injury most of the year which limited her playing time and effectiveness. Tremitiere retired on April 23, 2001, from the WNBA at the age of 31. She played professional basketball briefly again in Turkey and for the WABA team, the York City Noise, in 2002.

Post-WNBA activities
Together with KLC, she produced the rap hit Hoody Hoo by TRU. When she left basketball, Tremitiere pursued other interests such as acting. She can be seen in the 2002 Walt Disney movie Double Teamed about Heather and Heidi Burge, WNBA superstars. Chantel has held many charity basketball games, bringing businesses and celebrities together for the benefit of the community in Sacramento and York. She continues her commitment to community service, speaking for youth groups and volunteering to work with at-risk youth. She was also a guest speaker at North American Council on Adoptable Children (NACAC)'s 2005 annual conference in Pittsburgh, Pennsylvania.

She founded BLANK MiNDZ, a video and graphic production company in Atlanta, GA in 2005. 

After returning to Auburn for graduate school, she completed her MBA in 2015 and her PhD in 2017.

As of 2019, she teaches at Auburn University in the business school while leading BLANK MiNDZ.

References 

 Owens, T. &  Helmer, D., Teamwork: The Sacramento Monarchs in Action. New York: Powerkid Press, 1999.
  Meyer, J., Women in Sports  (retrieved 12-29-05)
 WNBA player retires (04-23-01) (retrieved 12-29-05)
 Clark, S., "Giving adopted kids a shot - professional basketball player Chantel Tremitiere helps adoptees," Essence July 1998.
 Ms. Tremitiere's presentation at NACAC 2005 in Pittsburgh, PA

1969 births
Living people
American adoptees
American expatriate basketball people in Poland
American women's basketball players
Auburn Tigers women's basketball players
Basketball players from Pennsylvania
Indiana Fever players
Point guards
Sacramento Monarchs players
Sportspeople from York, Pennsylvania
Utah Starzz players